
William Henry Getchell (1829–1910) was a photographer in 19th-century Boston, Massachusetts. He was born in Hallowell, Maine, on March 10, 1829. He lived in Peoria, Illinois, and then moved to Boston. In 1857 he married Sarah Hartwell; they had one child—Frederick Getchell (b. 1858). In the early 1860s Getchell worked in Boston with George M. Silsbee and John G. Case as Silsbee, Case & Co.; and again with Case as Case & Getchell, ca.1862-1864. He later ran a solo photography studio in the 1860s and 1870s. As of 1898 he lived in Dorchester. He died in Boston in August, 1910.

References

Images

Case & Getchell

W.H. Getchell

External links

Silsbee, Case & Co.
 Flickr. Portrait of Henry Wadsworth Longfellow, by Silsbee, Case & Co., ca.1863
 Flickr. Portrait of the wife of George W. Holdrege, by Silsbee, Case & Co. 
 Harvard University, works by Silsbee, Case & Co.
 Massachusetts Historical Society, works by Silsbee, Case & Co.
Case & Getchell (1862–1864)
 New York Public Library. John Lothrop Motley
 New York Public Library. John Howard Payne
 Flickr. Portrait of an unidentified woman, ca.1864
 Flickr. Portrait of an unidentified man
 Flickr. Portrait of a soldier
W.H. Getchell
 Flickr. Rose, Twin Sister of Spirit Child, Lily - Carte de Visite - 1869
 Flickr. Spirit Drawing of Lily "Sunbeam" - Carte de Visite - 1869

1829 births
1910 deaths
Photographers from Massachusetts
Artists from Boston
People from Hallowell, Maine
19th century in Boston
19th-century American photographers
20th-century American photographers